Juan Jiménez Martín (27 May 1858, Ávila - 1901, Madrid) was a Spanish painter who specialized in historical scenes. Some sources give his year of birth as 1855, and his name as "Giménez".

Biography 
He studied at the Real Academia de Bellas Artes de San Fernando in Madrid, under the tutelage of Federico de Madrazo, Carlos Luis de Ribera and Carlos de Haes. 

He was enrolled there from 1882 to 1886 and, inspired by the works of Mariano Fortuny, began creating Orientalist paintings. During his stay there, he also visited Florence, Naples and Venice; producing mostly landscapes.

Upon returning to Ávila, he presented the Diputación with his portrait of "", a heroine of the Reconquista.

He was a regular exhibitor at the National Exhibition of Fine Arts from 1876, when he presented a still-life, until the year of his death, when he received a third-class medal for his depiction of the interior of Ávila Cathedral. His entry for 1895, "A Roman Lady at her Dressing Table", has been displayed at the Congress of Deputies since 1904.

Sources 
  Carlos González, Pintores españoles en Roma (1850-1900), Tusquets Editores S.A., Barcelona, 1987 
  Bernardino de Pantorba, Historia y critica de las Exposiciones Nacionales de Bellas Artes Celebradas en España, revised ed., J. Ramón García-Rama, Madrid, 1980

External links

 Biography and works @ the Museo del Prado
 More works by Jiménez @ ArtNet

1858 births
1901 deaths
Spanish painters
History painters
Spanish orientalists
People from Ávila, Spain
Real Academia de Bellas Artes de San Fernando alumni